Psychoanalytic conceptions of language refers to the intersection of psychoanalytic theory with linguistics and psycholinguistics. Language has been an integral component of the psychoanalytic framework since its inception, as evidenced by the fact that Anna O. (pseud. for Bertha Pappenheim), whose treatment via the cathartic method influenced the later development of psychoanalytic therapy, referred to her method of treatment as the "talking cure" (Freud & Breuer, 1895; de Mijolla, 2005).

Language is relevant to psychoanalysis in two key respects. First, it is important with respect to the therapeutic process, serving as the principal means by which unconscious mental processes are given expression through the verbal exchange between analyst and patient (e.g., free association, dream analysis, transference-countertransference dynamics). Secondly, psychoanalytic theory is linked in many ways to linguistic phenomena, such as parapraxes and the telling of jokes. According to Freud (1915, 1923), the essential difference between modes of thought characterized by primary (irrational, governed by the id) as opposed to secondary (logical, governed by the ego and external reality) thought processes is one of preverbal vs. verbal ways of conceptualizing the world.

Freud's ideas on language

According to Freud (1940), "...the function of speech…brings material in the ego into a firm connection with the residues of visual, but more particularly of auditory, perceptions" (p. 35). In other words, the mind is able to assimilate perceptual information through language - we are able to make sense of our perceptions by thinking about them in the form of words.

Aphasia, thing- and word-presentations 

One of Freud's earliest papers, On Aphasia (1891), was concerned with speech disorders of neurological mechanisms of which had been investigated earlier in the century by Paul Broca and Carl Wernicke. Freud was skeptical of Wernicke's findings, citing a paucity of clinical observation as his reason. Although he conceded the fact that language is linked to neurological processes, Freud repudiated a model of localization of brain function, according to which specific regions of the brain are responsible for certain cognitive functions. In contrast to most of his contemporaries, Freud rejected the notion that in most cases pathological phenomena are manifestations of physiological dysfunctions (Lanteri-Laura, 2005a).

In the same paper, Freud (1891) distinguishes between word-presentations, the mental images of words, and thing-presentations, the representations of actual objects. Word-presentations involve the linking of a conscious idea to a verbal stimulus, are associated with the secondary processes, and are oriented towards reality. Thing-presentations are essentially pre- or nonverbal images of objects, are associated with the primary processes, and are not necessarily connected with reality (Rycroft, 1995; Gibeault, 2005a, 2005b; Lanteri-Laura, 2005b). The influence of the external world on the ego is apparent here in that mental processes and word-presentations become connected only gradually as the ego differentiates from the id as a result of contact with the environment (Rycroft, 1995; Freud, 1923). The idea of thing vs. word-presentations is also evident in Freud's hypotheses concerning schizophrenia (Rycroft, 1995; Freud, 1894, 1896). It is suggested that, as a defense against intrapsychic conflict, schizophrenics divest thing-presentations of significance and come to treat word-presentations as actual things (cf. mental functioning in Piaget's preoperational stage of cognitive development).

Parapraxes, jokes 
The parapraxes (e.g., slips of the tongue and pen) and humor were two other areas related to language that Freud investigated. He conceptualized speech errors as discrepancies between what a speaker intended to say and what he or she actually said, indicating that the intention was unconscious and prevented from being expressed accurately due to intrapsychic conflict (Freud, 1901). In terms of humor, Freud (1905) believed that jokes were an innocuous way of expressing sexual and/or aggressive impulses and easing psychic tension, thereby producing a degree of pleasure. Like dreams and neurotic symptoms, jokes serve as compromise-formations and are indicative of many of the same fundamental processes characteristic of the unconscious, e.g., condensation and displacement. However, unlike dreams and symptoms, jokes occur in an inter- rather than intrapersonal context and are dependent on the listener's ability to discern the ways in which the sense of the joke has been distorted through the condensation of words, multiple use of the same words or phrases, and the double meaning of words (cf. Paul Grice's cooperative principle, cf. also Ephratt 2004). The humorous quality of the following joke by Viennese journalist Daniel Spitzer is the result of simple phrase rearrangement:

In this joke, we see multiple use of the same phrase with words in a different order, as well as the double meaning of the words "lay" and "lain." Ostensibly about a couple's financial status, this joke is effective because it allows for the overcoming of inhibition and the indirect expression of sexual impulses through the double meaning of words.

Psychoanalysis and psycholinguistics

Over the past half century, there have been efforts by psychoanalysts and cognitive psychologists to bridge the gap between their two respective disciplines. Rizzuto (2002) has discussed the nature of the verbal exchange between analyst and patient in the context of Roman Jakobson's (1976, 1990) typology of the six functions of "the speech event": (1) referential, involving contextual information; (2) poetic, referring to the construction of the form of the message; (3) emotive, or the speaker's emotional influence vis-a-vis the receiver; (4) conative, or the speaker's orientation toward the receiver; (5) phatic, or the attempt to establish and maintain contact between speaker and receiver (e.g., "Can you hear me?"); and (6) metalingual, or the application of language to itself (e.g.,"What do you mean with that word?"). Rizzuto (2002) suggests that by paying an equal amount of attention to each of the six functions of the speech act, the analyst can obtain a more comprehensive picture of the patient's affective life. Conversely, by focusing on one function at a time, the analyst can ascertain the patient's different ways of mitigating anxiety or coping with stress.

In a symposium paper on psychoanalysis and linguistics, Harris (1995) offers a variety of reasons why the mutual exchange of ideas between the two disciplines is an important enterprise. The theoretical shift in psychoanalysis from libidinal (of the Libido) development and drive states to object relations and attachment, first initiated around the middle of the twentieth century, is now incorporating more and more elements of cognitive science and psycholinguistics. The framework of intersubjectivity and model of the therapeutic alliance as a reciprocal exchange constructed by both analyst and patient call for a modification to both theory and practice, the ultimate aim of which is to think of the analytic process more in terms of interpersonal relations and "complex language worlds" (p. 616). Furthermore, over the past twenty years infancy research has greatly informed psychoanalytic theory, and the concepts of symbolism and mental representation have influenced both frameworks. According to Harris (1995), the processes involved in the transition from nonverbal to verbal ways of thinking about and experiencing the world, first investigated in infancy research, have pointed to the relevance of language with respect to psychoanalytic thinking. A closer interdisciplinary relationship between psychoanalysis and linguistics could potentially bolster the former's status as a research paradigm at the intersection of hermeneutics and natural science, a reformulation that some analysts have suggested (Strenger, 1991).

The new journal Language and Psychoanalysis is just devoted to research in the intersection between psychoanalysis and linguistics.

References

A. de Mijolla (2005). "Anna O., case of." In: A. de Mijolla (Ed.), International dictionary of psychoanalysis, vol. 1 (pp. 87–89). Farmington Hills, MI: Thomson Gale. 
Ephratt Michal, 2004, “The pig’s grunt: Grice’s cooperation principle and psychoanalytic transference discourse”, Semiotica, Vol. 149(1/4), pp. 161–198.
Freud, S. (1891). On aphasia. E. Stengel (Trans.). International Universities Press, 1953.
Freud, S. (1894). The defense neuro-psychoses. In P. Rieff (Ed.), Early psychoanalytic writings(pp. 67–82). New York: Collier Books, 1963.
Freud, S., & Breuer, J. (1895). Studies on hysteria. New York: Basic Books, 2000.
Freud, S. (1896). Further remarks on the defense neuro-psychoses. In P. Rieff (Ed.), Early psychoanalytic writings (pp. 151–174). New York: Collier Books, 1963.
Freud, S. (1901). The psychopathology of everyday life. W.W. Norton & Co., 1971.
Freud, S. (1905). Jokes and their relation to the unconscious. W.W. Norton & Co., 1960.
Freud, S. (1915). The unconscious. In P. Rieff (Ed.), General psychological theory: Papers on metapsychology (pp. 116–150). New York: Simon & Schuster, 1991.
Freud, S. (1923). The ego and the id. New York: W.W. Norton & Co., 1960.
Freud, S. (1940). An outline of psychoanalysis. W.W. Norton & Co., 1969.
Gibeault, A. (2005a). Thing-presentation. In A. de Mijolla (Ed.), International dictionary of psychoanalysis, vol. 3 (pp. 1741–1743). Farmington Hills, MI: Thomson Gale. 
Gibeault, A. (2005b). Word-presentation. In A. de Mijolla (Ed.), International dictionary of psychoanalysis, vol. 3 (pp. 1873–1875). Farmington Hills, MI: Thomson Gale. 
Harris, A. (1995). Symposium on psychoanalysis and linguistics: Part 1. Psychoanalytic Dialogues, 5, 615-618.
Jakobson, R. (1976). Selected writings, vol. 7: Metalanguage as a linguistic problem. Hawthorne, NY: Mouton.
Jakobson, R. (1990). The speech event and the function of language. In L. R. Waugh & M. Monville-Burston (Eds.), On language. Cambridge, MA and London: Harvard University Press.
Lanteri-Laura, G. (2005a). Aphasia. In A. de Mijolla (Ed.), International dictionary of psychoanalysis, vol. 1 (pp. 106–107). Farmington Hills, MI: Thomson Gale. 
Lanteri-Laura, G. (2005b). Language and disturbances of language. In A. de Mijolla (Ed.), International dictionary of psychoanalysis, vol. 2 (pp. 942–943). Farmington Hills, MI: Thomson Gale. 
Rizzuto, A. (2002). Speech events, language development and the clinical situation. International Journal of Psycho-Analysis, 83, 1325-1343.
Rycroft, C. (1995). A critical dictionary of psychoanalysis. London: Penguin Books.
Strenger, C. (1991). Between hermeneutics and science. New York: International Universities Press.

Note
2. http://criminalisticassociation.org/Dokumenti/KTIP_12_20201219201241.pdf#page=8 (SCAN revisited through linguistic psychoanalysis)

Psychoanalysis
Psycholinguistics
Humour